The Yang clan of Hongnong (弘農楊氏) was a prominent Chinese clan known for producing many high-ranking officials and imperial concubines. Their ancestral home was Hongnong Commadery (農楊郡). It is noted the Yang clan of Hongnong  may originate from Yangshe clan (羊舌氏).

The first notable member of this clan was Yang Chang (楊敞), who served as  Prime Minister during the Western Han Dynasty.

The Hongnong Yang clan tomb in Shaoguan County, Shaanxi Province, has been used for several generations since Yang Zhen.

According to the Book of Sui, Yang Jian the founding emperor of Sui Dynasty, was born in Hongnong Yang's family and was a descendant of Yang Zhen.

Notable people

Males 

 Yang Chang (楊敞) – He served as Prime Minister during the reign of Emperoe Zhao of Han
 Yang Biao (楊彪) – He was scholar of the Han Dynasty. He became a consultant and joined the group of scholars who were ordered to prepare a fourth installment of the Record of Han.
 Yang Xiu (楊修) –  He was the son of Yang Biao (楊彪) and an official and adviser serving under the warlord Cao Cao.He also served as Registrar of the Imperial Chancellor(丞相主簿).
 Yang Ci (禓賜) – He was a tutor to Emperor Ling. He became Minister Steward and Minister of the Household. In 173, Yang ci was appointed as Excellency of the Works and in 176, he became Excellency Masses.
 Yang Bao (楊寶) – He was a scholar of Classic of History during the end of Western Han Dynasty. He lived and taught in seclusion.
 Yang Zhen (楊震) – He was the son of Yang Bao; He was an official of the Eastern Han Dynasty.
 Yang Fu  – He was a grandson of Yang Zhen and was known for his good personal qualities.
 Yang Fu – He was a grandson of Yang Zhen. He was appointed as a gentlemen cadet and become the commander of the guards.
 Yang Su (楊素) – He was a military strategist during the Sui Dynasty. He held the title of Duke of Chu (楚国公). He was posthumously honoured as Duke Jingwu of Chu (楚景武国公).
 Yang Yuqing (楊虞卿) – He was a close associate of Emperor Wenzong of Tang the mayor of Jingzhao Municipality.

Females

Imperial Consorts

References

Sources 
 隋书·卷三十三·志第二十八》：《杨氏血脉谱》二卷
 宋史·卷二百四·志第一百五十七》：杨侃《家谱》一卷
 

Chinese clans